"Hawái" (English: "Hawaii") is a song recorded by Colombian singer Maluma, released on July 29, 2020, through Sony Music Latin as the second single from Maluma's fifth studio album, Papi Juancho (2020). A reggaeton song with pop ballad elements, it was written by Maluma, Edgar Barrera, René Cano, Kevin Cruz, Kevin Jiménez, Johan Espinosa, Stiven Rojas, Bryan Lezcano, Andrés Uribe and Juan Vargas, and co-produced by Ily Wonder, Jowan, Keityn, and Kevin ADG and Chan El Genio (The Rude Boyz). A remix with Canadian singer The Weeknd was released on November 5, 2020, accompanying a music video. 

"Hawái" topped the Billboard Hot Latin Songs chart for nine weeks consecutively, giving Maluma his first number one hit on the chart. The song has also topped the record charts in Argentina, Chile, Colombia, Mexico, Panama, and Spain. After the release of the remix that improved its charting performance, the song peaked at number 12 on the US Billboard Hot 100, and at number three on the Global 200 chart. "Hawái" also became the first number-one single on the Billboard Global Excl. U.S. chart.

Background and composition
"Hawái" is a reggaeton song with pop ballad elements about the protagonist dealing with his ex lover publicly preaching her newfound happiness  after their break-up, not convinced by her social media persona.

In August 2020, Paris Saint-Germain F.C. player Ángel Di Maria posted an Instagram story singing "Hawái" alongside other teammates, including Neymar, who the press noticed became close friends with Maluma's ex-girlfriend. Shortly after, Maluma closed his Instagram account, with the reaction receiving media coverage. The singer later explained that the latter was unrelated to the video and that he was appreciative of them playing the song, denying having any problem with Neymar. Maluma also denied that the song was inspired by his personal life, despite several similarities.

Music video
The music video for "Hawái" was released on the same day as the single. Filmed in Miami, the video was directed by Jessy Terrero and stars Maluma and model Yovanna Ventura. In the video, Maluma argues with his girlfriend (portrayed by Ventura) and consequently breaks up with her. Maluma proceeds to crash his ex's wedding ceremony in order to win her back. The music video has generated over 500 million views on YouTube as of November 2020.

Live performances
On August 30, 2020, Maluma performed "Hawái" at the 2020 MTV Video Music Awards. He performed in a drive-in concert on a stage near the East River. He also performed the song at the 2020 Billboard Latin Music Awards and at the 2020 MTV Europe Music Awards in a medley with "Djadja (Remix)".

The Weeknd remix

Background and release
A day after posting a picture together on their respective Instagram pages teasing a collaboration, Maluma and the Weeknd released a remixed version of "Hawái" on November 5, 2020. The Weeknd opens the song with a verse in English and sings the hook in Spanish. A music video directed by Jessy Terrero accompanied the release as well, wherein both artists perform the song in a "neon-lit club".

In Billboard, Leila Cobo noticed "[it] wasn't a last-minute, let's-slap-this-together remix, but a let-me-write-a-new-verse-and-work-on-my-Spanish collaboration." In an interview with the magazine, Maluma's music partner Miguel Lua stated that, "Originally, Maluma didn't want to do a remix... he doesn't have any bilingual remixes, and in this particular case, he wasn't looking for one... [however] he had a short list of artists he wanted to work on in general." The Weeknd's manager Sal Slaiby contacted Lua in early October saying that the singer was considering "doing something for the Latin market" and asking for Maluma's unreleased tracks to listen, with the other part proposing them the idea of the remix. They shot the video in Los Angeles and delivered it to Sony Music Latin the night before the release.

Critical reception
Justin Curto of Vulture commented that the Weeknd "brings his R&B longing" to the first verse of the track, which "seems like an extension of his After Hours universe", until he "begins singing in Spanish and loosening up onstage" in the video. He also opined that "the Spanish is fine, but the dancing is unexpectedly dorky, especially compared to the Papi Juancho himself, still oozing sex appeal here" and concluded that his dance routine "just might be the thing that makes you smile today." News agency EFE opined that "the song flows while both artists keep their musical identities intact." Andrew Tendrell of NME called it a "slick party gem" and Jessica Roiz of Billboard deemed it a "fiery" remix.

Commercial performance
On the US Billboard Hot 100, the original version peaked at number 55, becoming Maluma's 6th chart entry. After the release of the remix version with The Weeknd, the song peaked at number 12 on November 1, 2020, becoming his first top 15 and highest-charting single in the US, surpassing his collaboration "Arms Around You".

Charts

Weekly charts

Year-end charts

All-time charts

Certifications

Original version

The Weeknd remix

See also
List of Billboard Hot Latin Songs and Latin Airplay number ones of 2020

References

External links

2020 singles
2020 songs
Maluma songs
The Weeknd songs
Songs written by Maluma (singer)
Songs written by the Weeknd
Song recordings produced by Edgar Barrera
Songs about Hawaii
Spanish-language songs
Sony Music Latin singles
Argentina Hot 100 number-one singles
Number-one singles in Colombia
Number-one singles in Mexico
Number-one singles in Spain
Billboard Global Excl. U.S. number-one singles
Music videos directed by Jessy Terrero